Michelle Eileen Waterson (born January 6, 1986) is an American mixed martial artist and model who competes in the Ultimate Fighting Championship (UFC). She is the former Invicta FC Atomweight Champion. Between 2013 and 2014, she was ranked the No. 1 women's atomweight fighter in the world. As of March 7, 2023, she is #10 in the UFC women's strawweight rankings.

Early life
Born in Colorado Springs and raised in Aurora, Waterson is of European and Thai descent: her father is American and mother Thai. She began her modeling career in 2004 after she graduated from Aurora Central High School. She then attended the University of Denver until she realized she wanted to pursue a career in fighting.

Early martial arts career
Her early interest in Gymnastics, and inability to pay for classes, led her to Karate at the age of ten.

Waterson holds a black belt in American Freestyle Karate and has also trained in Wushu, Muay Thai, Brazilian Jiu-Jitsu, Boxing and Wrestling.

Waterson rose to fame as a contestant on the Muay Thai-themed Fight Girls reality show on the Oxygen television network. She was also featured as one of the fighters in the MTV/MTV2 reality show Bully Beatdown.

Professional mixed martial arts career
Waterson made her MMA debut on February 16, 2007, at Ring of Fire 28: Evolution against Andrea Miller, winning the fight by unanimous decision. She made her debut without having any amateur fights.

She faced Freestyle Cage Fighting champion Lynn Alvarez at Ring of Fire 31: Undisputed on December 1, 2007, but lost by submission in the first round.

Waterson made her Strikeforce debut against Tyra Parker at Strikeforce: Payback on October 3, 2008. She won the fight by rear naked choke submission in the first round.

Waterson faced Karina Taylor at Duke City MMA Series 1 on March 1, 2009. She won the fight by armbar submission in the first round. There was some controversy with this fight because Taylor did not tap out to the armbar.

On April 11, 2009, Waterson fought former WIBA and IFBA Flyweight Boxing Champion Elena Reid at Apache Gold: Extreme Beatdown. Reid won the fight by TKO in the second round.

Waterson faced the debuting Rosary Califano at EB - Beatdown at 4 Bears 6 and won by submission due to a flying armbar in just 15 seconds.

She faced Masako Yoshida at Crowbar MMA: Spring Brawl on April 24, 2010. Waterson won the fight by TKO in the first round.

Waterson returned to MMA on January 21, 2012. She faced Diana Rael at Jackson's MMA Series 7 and won the fight by rear-naked choke in the first round.

Invicta Fighting Championships
Waterson faced Lacey Schuckman at Invicta FC 3: Penne vs. Sugiyama on October 6, 2012. After three back and forth rounds, Waterson defeated Schuckman via split decision. The bout was named Fight of the Night.

Waterson challenged for the Invicta FC Atomweight Championship when she faced Jessica Penne in the main event of Invicta FC 5: Penne vs. Waterson on April 5, 2013. Waterson won the fight via armbar submission in the fourth round to become the Invicta FC Atomweight Champion. On September 6, 2014, Waterson successfully defended her championship against Yasuko Tamada in the main event of Invicta FC 8 via TKO in the third round.

Waterson next headlined Invicta FC 10 on December 5, 2014, in Houston against Brazilian Hérica Tibúrcio. She lost the fight via a guillotine choke submission in the third round.

Ultimate Fighting Championship
On April 28, 2015, it was reported that Waterson had officially signed with the UFC and was expected to compete in the Women's Strawweight division. Waterson made her promotional debut against Angela Magaña on July 12, 2015, at The Ultimate Fighter 21 Finale. She won the fight via submission in the third round.

Waterson was next expected to meet Tecia Torres at UFC 194. However, she was forced to pull out of the bout on November 24, 2015, citing a knee injury.

After over a year-and-a-half away from the sport due to injuries, Waterson returned in December 2016 to face Paige VanZant in the main event at UFC on Fox 22. She won the fight via technical submission due to a rear naked choke in the first round. The win also earned Waterson her first Performance of the Night bonus award.

Waterson fought Rose Namajunas on April 15, 2017, at UFC on Fox 24. She lost via rear naked choke. Waterson faced Tecia Torres on December 2, 2017, at UFC 218. She lost the fight by unanimous decision.

Waterson faced Cortney Casey at UFC on Fox 29 on April 14, 2018. She won the fight via split decision. Waterson next faced Felice Herrig on October 6, 2018, at UFC 229. She won the fight via unanimous decision.

Waterson fought Karolina Kowalkiewicz at UFC on ESPN 2 on March 30, 2019. She won the fight via unanimous decision.

Waterson faced Joanna Jędrzejczyk on October 12, 2019 at UFC Fight Night 161. She lost the fight via unanimous decision.

Waterson was scheduled to face Carla Esparza on April 11, 2020 at UFC Fight Night: Overeem vs. Harris. Due to the COVID-19 pandemic, the event was eventually postponed and the bout eventually took place on May 9, 2020 at UFC 249. She lost the fight via split decision.

Waterson was scheduled to meet Angela Hill on August 22, 2020 at UFC on ESPN 15.  However, due to some personal reasons on Waterson's side, the bout was moved three weeks later to UFC Fight Night 177. She won the fight via split decision. This fight earned her the Fight of the Night award. After the fight, Waterson was awarded her BJJ brown belt in the octagon from her coach, Gracie Barra's Rafael 'Barata' Freitas.

Waterson was scheduled to face Amanda Ribas on January 24, 2021 at UFC 257. However, Waterson pulled out of the bout in early December due to undisclosed reasons. She was replaced by Marina Rodriguez. In May 2021, Waterson clarified that the reason for withdrawal was the loss of two grandparents.

Waterson faced Marina Rodriguez on May 8, 2021 at UFC on ESPN 24. She lost the fight via unanimous decision.

Waterson was scheduled to face Amanda Ribas on March 26, 2022 at UFC Fight Night 205. However, the bout was postponed to UFC 274 on May 7, 2022 due to Waterson sustaining an undisclosed injury.

Waterson faced Amanda Lemos on July 16, 2022, at UFC on ABC 3. She lost the fight via a guillotine choke submission in the second round.

Waterson is scheduled to face  Luana Pinheiro on April 8, 2023 at UFC 287.

Championships and accomplishments

Mixed martial arts
Invicta Fighting Championships
Invicta FC Atomweight Championship (One time)
One successful title defense
Fight of the Night (Two times) 
Women's MMA Awards
2013 Atomweight of the Year
2013 Fight of the Year  vs. Jessica Penne on April 5 
2014 Fight of the Year  vs. Hérica Tibúrcio on December 5 
AwakeningFighters.com WMMA Awards
2013 Atomweight of the Year
2014 Atomweight of the Year
FightBooth.com
2014 Most Vulgar Display of Power Award (Beatdown of the Year) vs. Yasuko Tamada
Ultimate Fighting Championship
Performance of the Night (One time) 
Fight of the Night (One time) 
MMAjunkie.com
2020 September Fight of the Month

Personal life
Waterson is married to former U.S. Armed Forces amateur boxing champion Joshua Gomez. On September 16, 2010, Waterson announced that she was pregnant with her first child and recently engaged. She gave birth to a daughter on March 18, 2011.

Waterson got her 'Karate Hottie' nickname after she went to a Hooters calendar shoot.

Media appearances
In 2008, Knockouts released a calendar featuring her.

She is featured in the music video for Head Crusher, the first single from the Endgame album by the American Metal band Megadeth.

On June 24, 2014, she appeared on American Ninja Warrior but failed to qualify when she fell on the first obstacle.

She was also featured on Bully Beatdown. She was the central character of the 2016 documentary Fight Mom.

In 2017, Waterson competed on the special mini-series for the MTV reality show The Challenge titled Champs vs. Stars. That same year, she was featured in The Body Issue.

Waterson also performed some stunts in the Marvel movie, Thor, for Natalie Portman.

Selected filmography

Mixed martial arts record

|-
|Loss
|align=center|18–10
|Amanda Lemos
|Submission (guillotine choke)
|UFC on ABC: Ortega vs. Rodríguez
|
|align=center|2
|align=center|1:48
|Elmont, New York, United States
|
|-
|Loss
|align=center|18–9
|Marina Rodriguez
|Decision (unanimous)
|UFC on ESPN: Rodriguez vs. Waterson
|
|align=center|5
|align=center|5:00
|Las Vegas, Nevada, United States
|
|-
|Win
|align=center|18–8
|Angela Hill
|Decision (split)
|UFC Fight Night: Waterson vs. Hill
|
|align=center|5
|align=center|5:00
|Las Vegas, Nevada, United States
|
|-
|Loss
|align=center|17–8
|Carla Esparza
|Decision (split)
|UFC 249
|
|align=center|3
|align=center|5:00
|Jacksonville, Florida, United States
|
|-
|Loss
|align=center|17–7
|Joanna Jędrzejczyk
|Decision (unanimous)
|UFC Fight Night: Joanna vs. Waterson
|
|align=center|5
|align=center|5:00
|Tampa, Florida, United States
|
|-
|Win
|align=center|17–6
|Karolina Kowalkiewicz
|Decision (unanimous)
|UFC on ESPN: Barboza vs. Gaethje
|
|align=center|3
|align=center|5:00
|Philadelphia, Pennsylvania, United States
|
|-
|Win
|align=center|16–6
|Felice Herrig
||Decision (unanimous)
|UFC 229
|
|align=center|3
|align=center|5:00
|Las Vegas, Nevada, United States
|
|- 
|Win
|align=center|15–6
|Cortney Casey
|Decision (split)
|UFC on Fox: Poirier vs. Gaethje
|
|align=center|3
|align=center|5:00
|Glendale, Arizona, United States
|
|-
|Loss
|align=center|14–6
|Tecia Torres
|Decision (unanimous)
|UFC 218
|
|align=center|3
|align=center|5:00
|Detroit, Michigan, United States
|
|-
|Loss
|align=center|14–5
|Rose Namajunas
|Submission (rear-naked choke)
|UFC on Fox: Johnson vs. Reis
|
|align=center|2
|align=center|2:47
|Kansas City, Missouri, United States
|
|-
|Win
|align=center|14–4
|Paige VanZant
|Technical Submission (rear-naked choke)
|UFC on Fox: VanZant vs. Waterson
|
|align=center|1
|align=center|3:21
|Sacramento, California, United States
|
|-
|Win
|align=center|13–4
|Angela Magaña
|Submission (rear-naked choke)
|The Ultimate Fighter: American Top Team vs. Blackzilians Finale
|
|align=center|3
|align=center|2:38
|Las Vegas, Nevada, United States
|
|-
| Loss
| align=center| 12–4
| Hérica Tibúrcio
| Submission (guillotine choke)
| Invicta FC 10: Waterson vs. Tiburcio
| 
| align=center| 3
| align=center| 1:06
| Houston, Texas, United States
| 
|-
| Win
| align=center| 12–3
| Yasuko Tamada
| TKO (knee and punches)
| Invicta FC 8: Waterson vs. Tamada
| 
| align=center| 3
| align=center| 4:58
| Kansas City, Missouri, United States
| 
|-
| Win
| align=center| 11–3
| Jessica Penne
| Submission (armbar)
| Invicta FC 5: Penne vs. Waterson
| 
| align=center| 4
| align=center| 2:31
| Kansas City, Missouri, United States
| 
|-
| Win
| align=center| 10–3 
| Lacey Schuckman 
| Decision (split)
| Invicta FC 3: Penne vs. Sugiyama
| 
| align=center| 3
| align=center| 5:00
| Kansas City, Kansas, United States
| 
|-
| Win
| align=center| 9–3
| Diana Rael
| Submission (rear-naked choke)
| Jackson's MMA Series 7
| 
| align=center| 1
| align=center| 2:12
| Albuquerque, New Mexico, United States
| 
|-
| Win
| align=center| 8–3
| Masako Yoshida
| TKO (punches)
| Crowbar MMA: Spring Brawl
| 
| align=center| 1
| align=center| 4:17
| Fargo, North Dakota, United States
| 
|-
| Win
| align=center| 7–3
| Rosary Califano
| Submission (flying armbar)
| EB - Beatdown at 4 Bears 6
| 
| align=center| 1
| align=center| 0:15
| New Town, North Dakota, United States
| 
|-
| Loss
| align=center| 6–3
| Elena Reid
| TKO (punches)
| Apache Gold: Extreme Beatdown
| 
| align=center| 2
| align=center| 1:50
| Phoenix, Arizona, United States
| 
|-
| Win
| align=center| 6–2
| Karina Taylor
| Technical Submission (armbar)
| Duke City MMA Series 1
| 
| align=center| 1
| align=center| 2:36
| Albuquerque, New Mexico, United States
| 
|-
| Win
| align=center| 5–2
| Tyra Parker
| Submission (rear-naked choke)
| Strikeforce: Payback
| 
| align=center| 1
| align=center| 1:20
| Denver, Colorado, United States
| 
|-
| Win
| align=center| 4–2
| Krystal Macatol
| Submission (armbar)
| SCA: Bike n Brawl 2
| 
| align=center| 1
| align=center| 0:22
| Albuquerque, New Mexico, United States
| 
|-
| Win
| align=center| 3–2
| Thricia Poovey
| TKO (corner stoppage)
| KOTC: Badlands
| 
| align=center| 2
| align=center| 5:00
| Albuquerque, New Mexico, United States
| 
|-
| Loss
| align=center| 2–2
| Lynn Alvarez
| Submission (guillotine choke)
| Ring of Fire 31: Undisputed
| 
| align=center| 1
| align=center| 1:19
| Broomfield, Colorado, United States
| 
|-
| Win
| align=center| 2–1
| Jaime Cook
| Submission (armbar)
| Ring of Fire 30: Domination
| 
| align=center| 1
| align=center| 1:33
| Broomfield, Colorado, United States
| 
|-
| Loss
| align=center| 1–1
| Alicia Gumm
| Decision (unanimous)
| RMBB: Battle of the Arts
| 
| align=center| 2
| align=center| 5:00
| Denver, Colorado, United States
| 
|-
| Win
| align=center| 1–0
| Andrea Miller
| Decision (unanimous)
| Ring of Fire 28: Evolution
| 
| align=center| 3
| align=center| 3:00
| Broomfield, Colorado, United States
| 
|-
|}

Kickboxing record 

|-  style="background:#fbb;"
| 2008-03-22 || Loss ||align=left| Catia Vitoria || XFA 1|| Las Vegas, Nevada, USA || Decision (unanimous) || 3 || 3:00
|-
| colspan=9 | Legend:

See also
 List of female mixed martial artists

References

External links

 
 

1986 births
American female karateka
American practitioners of Brazilian jiu-jitsu
American wushu practitioners
American sportspeople of Thai descent
Female Brazilian jiu-jitsu practitioners
American female mixed martial artists
Mixed martial artists utilizing karate
Mixed martial artists utilizing wushu
Mixed martial artists utilizing Brazilian jiu-jitsu
American models
Living people
Female models from Colorado
Sportspeople from Colorado
Sportspeople from Colorado Springs, Colorado
Sportspeople from Aurora, Colorado
Atomweight mixed martial artists
Strawweight mixed martial artists
The Challenge (TV series) contestants
Ultimate Fighting Championship female fighters
21st-century American women